The DRDO Nishant is an unmanned aerial vehicle (UAV) developed by India's Aeronautical Development Establishment (ADE), a branch of Defence Research and Development Organisation (DRDO) for the Indian Armed Forces. The Nishant UAV is primarily tasked with intelligence gathering over enemy territory and also for reconnaissance, training, surveillance, target designation, artillery fire correction, damage assessment, ELINT and SIGINT. The UAV has an endurance of four hours and thirty minutes. Nishant has completed development phase and user trials.

The 380 kg (840 lb) Nishant UAV requires rail-launching from a hydro-pneumatic launcher and is able to be recovered by a parachute system. Launches at a velocity of 45 m/s are carried out in 0.6 second with 100 kW power and subsequent launches can be carried out in intervals of 20 minutes. The Mobile Hydro-Pneumatic Launcher (MHPL) system mounted on a Tatra truck weighs 14,000 kg (31,000 lb) and boasts of a life cycle of 1000 launches before requiring overhaul. Nishant is one of the few UAVs in the world in its weight-class capable of being catapult-launched and recovered by using parachute, thus eliminating the need for a runway as in case of conventional take-off and landing with wheels.

Development
To meet the Army's operational requirement of a RPV (remotely piloted vehicle), it was decided in September 1988 that DRDO would undertake the indigenous development of the UAV. The General Staff Qualitative Requirement (GSQR) was finalised by the Army in May 1990. The Nishant RPV made its first test flight in 1995. In July 1999, for the first time the Indian army deployed its new Nishant UAV system in the fight against guerilla forces backed by Pakistan in Kashmir Valkey. Nishant, which had been developed for battlefield surveillance and reconnaissance needs of the Indian Army, was test flown again in early 2002. The indigenous Unmanned Air Vehicle (UAV) Nishant developed by ADE, DRDO had completed its 100th flight by June 15, 2002. The Indian Army has placed an order for 12 Nishant UAVs along with ground support systems. Nishant Unmanned Aerial Vehicle (UAV) developed by DRDO for Indian Army was successfully flight tested near Kolar on 20 June 2008. Nishant has completed development phase and user trials. The present flight tests are pre confirmatory trials before induction into services.

Test flight with Wankel engine
On Sunday, 5 April 2009 DRDO launched a test flight of the Nishant UAV. The main goal was to test the performance of the Wankel engine used on the UAV. An abandoned World War II runway at a village near Kolar played host to the first ever flight of this indigenous rotary engine-powered UAV. The flight took off on early Sunday morning and climbed to an altitude of  before cruising for a duration of 35 minutes. The air vehicle was recovered safely at the intended place at a dried-up lake, after a total flight duration of 40 min. The engine, a Wankel rotary type, was jointly designed and developed by National Aerospace Laboratories (NAL), Vehicle Research and Development Establishment (VRDE) and Aeronautical Development Establishment (ADE). The provisional flight clearance for the first indigenous prototype engine was given by the certifying agency, the Regional Centre for Military Airworthiness and Certification. The engine was cleared for flight after rigorous ground endurance test runs. The Wankel engine weighs about 30 kg (70 lb), and this engine type is known for its high power-to-weight ratio in a single rotor category.

DRDO was satisfied with the test results. The performance of the engine during the flight met the requirements of the first flight of an engine in the air vehicle. This 55 hp indigenous engine is expected to replace the present imported engine of Nishant. The critical core engine, including the special cylinder composite nickel–silicon carbide coating and special aluminium alloy castings, was designed and developed by NAL. VRDE developed engine peripherals such as the ignition and fuel systems and ADE developed flight testing. The reconnaissance UAV, which has completed its user trials with the Indian Army, is expected to be handed over to the army shortly.

Nishant UAV again underwent crucial confirmatory user trials at Pokhran in April 2010. The trials began April 20 and were supposed to last for one week. A senior Army official at Pokhran said the trials are moving forward in a very satisfactory manner. “We are checking three crucial parameters: video quality, tracking ability and fall of gunshot [missed distance after firing]. These input performances are critical to our operations in the forward areas,” the official said. DRDO has delivered the first four UAVs to the Indian Army at a cost of 800 million  ($17.9 million).

According to The Times Of India, two UAVs crash-landed in Jaisalmer district near the India-Pakistan border due to change in wind direction on April 28 and April 30. Confirming the news, a DRDO official said, "The user trials were going on and during the flight there were some technical snags owing to which the craft was landed using parachutes." He said, "But the landing was done safely and no one was hurt in the process. Though before our officials could reach to get the craft back, villagers damaged the aircraft and took away some equipment."

On 3 February 2011 Nishant UAV successfully completed confirmatory trials conducted by the Indian Army at Pokhran, Rajasthan

A wheeled version of the Nishant UAV, named panchi, is under taxi trail as of September 2014, will be flight tested soon. UAV is capable of operating from semi-prepared runway, thereby reducing the turnaround time between missions, which is major advantage over the current catapult launched Nishant
As per the last report Panchi have been successfully completed Five flights proving the concept of conventional takeoff and landing. Data for aerodynamic, structure integrity and Flight control studies have been generated and analyzed.

Features
 Day/night capability training vehicle
 Battlefield reconnaissance & surveillance,
 Target tracking and localization
 Artillery fire correction
 All terrain mobility
 Target designation (using integral laser target designator)
 Endurance: 4 h 30 min

Variants
 Nishant catapult
 Panchi (Nishant Wheeled version)

Ground support systems

Ground control station (GCS)
Antenna vehicle/Ground Data Terminal (GDT)
Avionics preparation vehicle (APV)
Mechanical maintenance vehicle
UAV transportation vehicle
Power supply vehicle

Launch & recovery
 Launch: Mobile hydropneumatic launcher (MHPL) system
 Recovery: Parachute + landing bags

Former operators

  Indian Army – 4 (all lost)

Specifications

See also

References

Unmanned military aircraft of India
Single-engined pusher aircraft
Twin-boom aircraft
Nishant